Farhad Daftary (born 1938 in Brussels) is a Belgian-born Iranian-British Islamic scholar who is co-director and head of the Department of Academic Research and Publications at the Institute of Ismaili Studies in London. He is related to the Aga Khan IV.

Daftary received a Ph.D. in Economics from the University of California, Berkeley in 1971.  He is a freelance consulting editor of the Encyclopædia Iranica, co-editor (with W. Madelung) of the Encyclopædia Islamica, and the general editor of the Ismaili Heritage Series and the Ismaili Texts and Translations Series.

Selected works
Books authored

Books edited

References

1938 births
Living people
20th-century Muslim scholars of Islam
Writers from Brussels
Iran's Book of the Year Awards recipients